Christoph Stark (born 12 April 1980) is a German former freestyle skier. He competed in the men's moguls event at the 2006 Winter Olympics.

References

External links
 

1980 births
Living people
German male freestyle skiers
Olympic freestyle skiers of Germany
Freestyle skiers at the 2006 Winter Olympics
People from Oberstdorf
Sportspeople from Swabia (Bavaria)
21st-century German people